The Ministry of Tourism and Hospitality Industry was a former government ministry, responsible for tourism in Zimbabwe, from 2017 to 2019.

Authorities
The 'Ministry of Tourism and Hospitality Industry oversaw:
 Zimbabwe Tourism Authority

Leaders 
Ministers
 December 2017 to August 2019, Prisca Mupfumira
 August 2019 to November 2019, as acting Minister, Nqobizitha Mangaliso Ndlovu
 November 2019, ministry dissolved and recombined as Ministry of the Environment, Climate Change, Tourism and Hospitality Industry under Nqobizitha Mangaliso Ndlovu.

Deputy Ministers
 Annastacia Ndhlovu

References

Government of Zimbabwe
Tourism in Zimbabwe
Zimbabwe